Petřvald refers to the following places in the Czech Republic:

 Petřvald (Karviná District), a town in Karviná District
 Petřvald (Nový Jičín District), a village in Nový Jičín District